Alexander Peya and Martin Slanar were the defending champions but decided not to participate.
Martin Fischer and Philipp Oswald won the title, defeating Alexander Waske and Lovro Zovko 6–3, 3–6, [14–12] in the final.

Seeds

Draw

Draw

References
 Main Draw

ATP Salzburg Indoors - Doubles
ATP Salzburg Indoors